Radhe Shyam is the 2022 soundtrack album composed by Justin Prabhakaran, Mithoon, Amaal Mallik, and Manan Bhardwaj to the 2022 Indian period romantic drama film of the same name written and directed by Radha Krishna Kumar, starring Prabhas and Pooja Hegde.

Production 
A. R. Rahman was reportedly approached to compose music for the film. However, Rahman did not sign the film.

The film was announced to have two different soundtracks for the Telugu and Hindi versions.

The Hindi soundtrack is composed by Mithoon, Amaal Mallik and Manan Bhardwaj, while Justin Prabhakaran is composing the songs in the Telugu version and dubbed versions.

Manoj Muntashir, Rashmi Virag, Kumaar, Mithoon were reported to be providing lyrics for Hindi, while Krishna Kanth is providing lyrics for Telugu. The soundtrack features a total of 6 songs in total.

On 13 November 2021, it was announced that the first single for the Telugu version was going to be released on 15 November 2021.

On 28 November 2021, it was announced that the first single for the Hindi version and the second single for the Telugu version were going to be released on 1 December 2021. However due to the passing of lyricist Sirivennela Seetharama Sastry, the Telugu version was delayed to 2 December 2021 while the Hindi version was still released on 1 December 2021.

On 5 December 2021, it was announced that the second single for the Hindi version was going to be released on 8 December 2021.

On 13 December 2021, it was announced that the third single for all the versions was going to be released on 16 December 2021.

Release 
The first single was released on 15 November 2021. The lyrical version of the single was made as a conceptual 3D video by Anil Kumar Upadyaula which features both the leads. The song was released as Ee Raathale (in Telugu), Aagoozhile (in Tamil), Kaanaakkare (in Malayalam) and Ee Reethile (in Kannada) with vocals by Yuvan Shankar Raja for Telugu and Tamil, Nihal Sadiq in Malayalam and Kannada while Harini Ivaturi gave the female vocals for all languages.

Track listing

References 

Telugu film soundtracks
Hindi film soundtracks
T-Series (company) soundtrack albums
2022 soundtrack albums
Drama film soundtracks
Romance film soundtracks